This article contains information about the literary events and publications of 1532.

Events
unknown dates
William Thynne's edition of The Workes of Geffray Chaucer is published in England.
First edition of François Villon's Œuvres with a commentary by Clément Marot is published in France.
First complete edition of Ariosto's Orlando Furioso is published in Italy.
Yamazaki Sōkan compiles the Shinseninutsukubashū, a significant anthology of Japanese renku poetry (from which haiku will develop).

New books

Prose
Otto Brunfels – Contrafayt Kräuterbuch (second and final part: 1537)
Sebald Heyden – De arte canendi (first installment)
Niccolò Machiavelli (posthumous) – The Prince (Il Principe)
Thomas More – The Confutation of Tyndale's Answer
François Rabelais (as Alcofribas Nasier) – Pantagruel (Les horribles et épouvantables faits et prouesses du très renommé Pantagruel Roi des Dipsodes, fils du Grand Géant Gargantua)
Feliciano de Silva – Don Florisel de Niquea

Poetry

Clément Marot – L'Adolescence clémentine

Births
February 19 – Jean-Antoine de Baïf, French poet and member of La Pléiade (died 1589)
November 28 – Bartholomäus Ringwaldt, German didactic poet (died c.1599)
Unknown dates
Étienne Jodelle, French poet and playwright associated with La Pléiade (died 1573)
Dominicus Lampsonius, Flemish humanist poet and painter (died 1599)
Probable year
Thomas Norton, English politician and poet (died 1584)
Tulsidas (तुलसीदास), Indian Hindu Awadhi language poet, sant and philosopher (died 1623)

Deaths
August 19 – Caritas Pirckheimer, German abbess and chronicler (born 1573)
unknown date – Thomas Arthur, dramatist (year of birth unknown)

References

1532

1532 books
Renaissance literature
Early Modern literature
Years of the 16th century in literature